Megan is a feminine given name.

Megan or Meghan may also refer to:

 MEGAN, a bioinformatics software for metagenomics
 Megan (2018 film), a fan film based on the Cloverfield franchise
 M3GAN, a 2023 horror film
 Megan (ship), a SpaceX Dragon recovery vessel
 Megan, a locality north-east of Dorrigo, New South Wales
 Meghan, Duchess of Sussex (born 1981), former American actress and member of the British Royal Family

See also
 Mehigan, an Irish language surname that has the variants Megan, Meaghan and Meighan
 Meggan (character)